La Argentinidad al Palo: Se Es, Lo Que Se Es is the seventh album by the Argentine Rock band Bersuit Vergarabat, released in 2004. Released firstly in two different discs, Se Es as disc 1 and Lo Que Se Es as disc 2.

Disc 1: Se Es

"Coger No Es Amor" [Fucking Is Not Love] (Cordera) – 4:06
"La Soledad" [Loneliness] (Cordera, Suárez, Sbarbatti) – 4:23
"Va Por Chapultepec" [Goes By Chapultepec] (Cordera, Céspedes) – 3:58
"Convalescencia En Valencia" [Convalescence in Valence] (Subirá) – 4:57
"Fisurar" (Verenzuela) [Fissure] – 3:19
"Al Olor Del Hogar" (Ariel Prat) [Smell Of The House] – 3:17
"La Argentinidad Al Palo" (Cordera, Righi, Subirá, Céspedes, Martín) – 5:29
"Ades Tiempo" (Verenzuela) – 3:37
"El Baile De La Gambeta" [Dribbling Dance] (Cordera) – 3:59
"No Seas Parca" [Don't Be A Death Man] (Subirá, Céspedes) – 3:43
"Como Un Bolu" (Subirá, Céspedes, Righi) [Like A Jerk] – 2:16
"La Calavera" [The Skull] (Cordera, Céspedes) – 5:42

Disc 2: Lo Que Se Es
"Shit Shit Money Money" (Cordera) – 5:11
"Porno Star" (Subirá) – 3:53
"La Oveja Negra" [The Black Sheep] (Cordera) – 4:20
"Otra Sudestada" (Cordera, Céspedes, Martín) – 6:26
"Zi Zi Zi" (Verenzuela) – 3:31
"Hecho En Buenos Aires" [Made In Buenos Aires] (Subirá, Céspedes) – 4:51
"Mariscal Tito" [Marshal Tito] (Cordera, Céspedes) – 4:49
"Y No Está Solo..." [He's Not Alone] (Cordera, Céspedes) – 6:44
"Pájaro Negro" [Black Bird] (Subirá) – 4:31
"Murga De La Limousine" (Subirá, Martín, Céspedes, Cordera) – 2:56
"El Viento Trae Una Copla" [The Wind Bring A Song] (Bersuit Vergarabat) – 8:21

Charts and certifications

References

2004 albums
Bersuit Vergarabat albums